The 2019–20 Coppin State Eagles men's basketball team represent Coppin State University in the 2019–20 NCAA Division I men's basketball season. The Eagles, led by third-year head coach Juan Dixon, play their home games at the Physical Education Complex in Baltimore, Maryland as members of the Mid-Eastern Athletic Conference.

Previous season
The Eagles finished the 2018–19 season 8–25 overall, 7–9 in MEAC play, finishing in 8th place. In the MEAC tournament, they defeated Morgan State in the first round, before falling to North Carolina A&T in the quarterfinals.

Roster

Schedule and results

|-
!colspan=12 style=| Non-conference regular season

|-
!colspan=9 style=| MEAC regular season

|-
!colspan=12 style=| MEAC tournament
|-

|-

Source

References

Coppin State Eagles men's basketball seasons
Coppin State Eagles
Coppin State Eagles men's basketball
Coppin State Eagles men's basketball